João Bosco Papaléo Paes (27 August 1952 – 25 June 2020), better known simply as Papaléo Paes, was a Brazilian politician and physician from the state of Pará who represented the state of Amapá at national level.

Career
Before pursuing a career in politics, Paes graduated as a Physician at the Federal University of Pará and later specialized in Cardiology in Rio de Janeiro.

He worked at the Hospital Geral de Macapá at a management level and in 1992 was appointed Health Secretary of Amapá.

In 1992, Paes was elected Mayor of Macapá and remained in charge between 1993 and 1996.

In 2000, he decided to run again at Macapá's mayoral election. This time however, he failed to secure enough votes to be elected.

In 2002, he was elected Senator representing the state of Amapá. His tenure lasted from 2003 to 2011.

In 2006, he ran at the Amapá state elections, but failed to secure enough votes to be elected Governor.

In 2014, Paes was elected Vice governor of Amapá. He kept his post from 2015 to 2018.

Personal life and death
Paes was married to Josélia Martins Papaléo Paes and had two daughters, Juliana and Jacyra.

On 25 June 2020, Paes died from complications brought on by COVID-19 in Macapá at the age of 67 during the COVID-19 pandemic in Brazil.

References

1952 births
2020 deaths
Vice Governors of Amapá
Amapá politicians
Mayors of places in Brazil
People from Macapá
Members of the Federal Senate (Brazil)
Progressistas politicians
Party of the Reconstruction of the National Order politicians
Brazilian Social Democracy Party politicians
Brazilian Labour Party (current) politicians
Brazilian Democratic Movement politicians
People from Belém
Deaths from the COVID-19 pandemic in Amapá